The Kidney Foundation of Canada promotes organ donor awareness, and fundraises for kidney/renal research at various hospitals across Canada. They have offices in most major cities in Canada.

References

External links
 
 The Kidney Foundation of Canada Ontario Branches

Health charities in Canada
Medical and health organizations based in Quebec
Kidney organizations